Frank Lammers was born on10 April, 1972. He is a Dutch television and film actor. In 2006, he won a "Best Actor" Golden Calf for his work in Nachtrit. Winner of the National News Quiz 2009 in the Netherlands.

Filmography

Film

Television series

References

External links
 
 

1972 births
Living people
Dutch male actors
Dutch male film actors
Dutch male stage actors
Dutch male television actors
Golden Calf winners
People from Mierlo
20th-century Dutch people